James Duncan Meyer (born 7 March 1966) is a former English cricketer.  Meyer was a right-handed batsman who bowled right-arm medium pace.  He was born at Wolverhampton, Staffordshire.

Meyer played a single MCCA Knockout Trophy match for Shropshire against Dorset in 1995.

In 2000, he represented the Worcestershire Cricket Board in a single List A match against the Kent Cricket Board in the 2000 NatWest Trophy.  In his only List A match, he scored 7 runs and took a single wicket at a cost of 42 runs.

References

External links
James Meyer at Cricinfo
James Meyer at CricketArchive

1966 births
Living people
Cricketers from Wolverhampton
English cricketers
Shropshire cricketers
Worcestershire Cricket Board cricketers